The Birmingham Bullets were a British professional basketball team from Birmingham, England who competed in the British Basketball League (BBL). The club was founded in 1974 as Coventry Granwood before moving to Birmingham in 1980 as part of the team's sponsorship agreement with Fiat. The Bullets achieved some success in the BBL, mostly in the late 1990s and early 2000s, including winning the Playoffs in 1996 and 1998. They also achieved a 2nd place League finish in 1998 and were runners up in the 2000 Playoffs and 2002 Trophy. In latter years, the club struggled both on and off the court. The club officially resigned from the BBL in the summer of 2006 and soon after went into liquidation. Since then both the Birmingham Panthers and Birmingham Knights have endured short-lived and unsuccessful spells in the BBL.

Notable former players

Season-by-season records

See also
British Basketball League

References

External links
Birmingham Bullets at Represent Sports
Birmingham Bullets news archive from icBirmingham

Basketball teams established in 1974
Basketball teams disestablished in 2006
Sport in Birmingham, West Midlands
Defunct basketball teams in England
1974 establishments in England
2006 disestablishments in England